Larisa Valeryevna Mikhaylova (Лариса Валерьевна Михайлова; born 13 July 1981) is a Russian-born Kazakhstani former water polo player. She was a member of the Kazakhstan women's national water polo team, playing as a driver. 

She was a part of the  team at the 2004 Summer Olympics. On club level she played for Uralochka Zlatoust in Russia.

References

1981 births
Living people
Kazakhstani female water polo players
Water polo players at the 2004 Summer Olympics
Olympic water polo players of Kazakhstan
Place of birth missing (living people)